The Costa Mesa Police Department (CMPD) is the police department of the city of Costa Mesa, California. The department is authorized 130 sworn officers plus additional civilian support staff.

Organization
The CMPD is authorized 130 officers plus civilian support staff. The sworn personnel are represented by the Costa Mesa Police Officer Association.

The department divides the city into Area 1 and Area 2 (subdivided into two patrol beats each), both areas being commanded by an officer in the rank of lieutenant.

The Support Services includes the Detective Bureau, Helicopter Bureau, Traffic Safety Bureau and the Communications Division. Technical Services include the jail, Property and Evidence Bureau, Records Bureau, and a Training and Recruitment Bureau.

The CMPD also operates a SWAT team, a motorcycle unit, and an animal control service.

History
On March 10, 1987 a helicopter from the CMPD collided with another helicopter operated by the Newport Beach Police Department. The two crewmen in the CMPD aircraft were killed, while the other aircraft was able to land safely.

As a result of the Great Recession, the 2011 budget for Costa Mesa included cuts to the CMPD. Items cut included a police helicopter program characterized as a "luxury" by the mayor. Police chief Staveley resigned in protest, claiming that the budget crisis was a fiction created by City Hall for political purposes.

See also

 List of law enforcement agencies in California

References

External links
 Department Website

Costa Mesa, California
Municipal police departments of California
Emergency services in Orange County, California
Government in Orange County, California
1953 establishments in California